Central Pacific Bank is an American regional commercial bank headquartered in Honolulu, Hawaii.  It was founded by Koichi Iida, a Honolulu business leader, with assistance from Sumitomo Bank in Japan. Mr. Iida was President from 1954 to 1960. It is the main subsidiary of Central Pacific Financial Corporation.  The bank is the fourth-largest financial institution in Hawaii, with $6.6 billion in assets as of December 31, 2020.

Central Pacific Financial Corporation
Central Pacific Financial Corporation is a bank holding company based in Honolulu, Hawaii, whose primary subsidiary is Central Pacific Bank. In 2004, Central Pacific Financial Corporation acquired CB Bancshares, Inc. CB Bancshares' main subsidiary was City Bank of Honolulu and it traded on NASDAQ under CBBI ticker. Before the merger, Central Pacific was the third largest and CB Bancshares was the fourth largest bank holding company in Hawaii. The merger left Central Pacific as the third largest. The management of CB Bancshares opposed the acquisition.

References

External links
Central Pacific Bank website

Companies listed on the New York Stock Exchange
Banks based in Hawaii
American companies established in 1954
Banks established in 1954
Companies based in Honolulu
1954 establishments in Hawaii